Penurin is a settlement and longhouse in Sarawak, Malaysia. Neighbouring settlements include:

References

Populated places in Sarawak